John M. Webster  (July 20, 1877 – June 7, 1963) was an  American politician who served  as the eighteenth Mayor, of Somerville, Massachusetts.

In December 1921 Webster was elected Mayor of Somerville, he was reelected over John J. Murphy in December 1923.

Notes

Massachusetts city council members
Massachusetts Republicans
Mayors of Somerville, Massachusetts
1877 births
1963 deaths